Jack Low was an Australian lawn bowls international who competed in the 1938 British Empire Games.

Bowls career
At the 1938 British Empire Games he won the bronze medal in the singles event.

He was the 1938 National singles runner-up when bowling for the Belmont Bowls Club in New South Wales. He previously bowled for the Lithgow Bowls Club.

References

Australian male bowls players
Bowls players at the 1938 British Empire Games
Commonwealth Games bronze medallists for Australia
Commonwealth Games medallists in lawn bowls
Medallists at the 1938 British Empire Games